The 506th Infantry Regiment, originally designated the 506th Parachute Infantry Regiment (506th PIR) during World War II, is an airborne light infantry regiment of the United States Army. Currently a parent regiment under the U.S. Army Regimental System, the regiment has two active battalions: the 1st Battalion, 506th Infantry Regiment (1-506th IR) is assigned to the 1st Brigade Combat Team, 101st Airborne Division, and the 2nd Battalion, 506th Infantry Regiment (2-506th IR) is assigned to the 3rd Brigade Combat Team, 101st Airborne Division.

The regiment served with the 101st Airborne Division in World War II. Regimental elements have served with the 101st in Vietnam, Iraq, and Afghanistan. Regimental elements have also served in peacetime with the 2nd Infantry Division, and deployed to Operation Iraqi Freedom.

The World War II actions of the regiment's Company E ("Easy Company") were portrayed in the 2001 HBO miniseries Band of Brothers.

History

World War II
The regiment was initially formed during World War II at Camp Toccoa, Georgia, in 1942 where it earned its nickname, "Currahees", after the camp's Currahee Mountain. Paratroopers in training ran from Camp Toccoa up Currahee Mountain and back with the shout "three miles up, three miles down!". The Cherokee word, which translates to "Stand Alone", also became the unit's motto. Members of the unit wear the spade (♠) symbol on the helmet outer and the Screaming Eagle patch (indicating membership in the 101st Airborne Division) on the left sleeve. Its first commanding officer was Colonel Robert F. Sink, and the 506th was sometimes referred to as the "Five-Oh-Sink". On 10 June 1943, the 506th Parachute Infantry Regiment officially became part of the 101st Airborne Division, commanded by Major General William Lee, the "father of the U.S. Army Airborne".

Sink read in Reader's Digest about a Japanese Army unit that held the world record for marching. Sink believed his men could do better, so he marched the regiment from Camp Toccoa to Atlanta:  in 75 hours and 15 minutes, including 33.5 hours of actual marching. Only 12 of the 2nd Battalion's 556 enlisted men failed to complete the march. All 30 officers completed it, including 2nd Battalion commander Major Robert Strayer. Newspapers covered the march; many civilians turned out to cheer the men as they neared Five Points. In Atlanta, they boarded trains for Airborne School in Fort Benning, Georgia.

The 506th would participate in three major battles during the war: D-day landings, Operation Market Garden, and the Battle of the Bulge. (They would have participated in Operation Varsity, but SHAEF decided to use the 17th Airborne Division instead.)

D-Day: Operation Overlord

Like almost all paratrooper units, the 506th was widely scattered during the Mission Albany night drop on the morning of D-Day.  The most famous action for the 506th on D-Day was the Brécourt Manor Assault led by 1st Lieutenant Richard Winters.  Later, they fought in the Battle of Carentan.

The unit had been promised that they would be in battle for just three days, but the 506th did not return to England for 33 days.  Of about 2,000 men who jumped into France, 231 were killed in action, 183 were missing or POWs, and 569 were wounded – about 50% casualties for the Normandy campaign.

Operation Market Garden
The airborne component of Operation Market Garden, Operation Market was composed of American units (82nd Airborne Division, the 101st Airborne Division, and the IX Troop Carrier Command), British units (1st Airborne Division) and Polish units (1st Independent Parachute Brigade). The airborne units were dropped near several key bridges along the axis of advance of the ground forces, Operation Garden, with the objective of capturing the bridges intact in order to allow a deep penetration into the German-occupied Netherlands and to capture the key bridge crossing the River Rhine at Arnhem.

The 101st Airborne was assigned five bridges just north of the German defensive lines northwest of Eindhoven. The daylight schedule resulted in well-targeted and controlled drops into the designated zones. The 101st captured all but one bridge, the one at Son, which its German defenders blew up as the airborne units approached. The ground forces of British XXX Corps linked up with elements of the 101st Airborne on the second day of operations but the advance of the ground forces was delayed while engineers replaced the Son bridge with a Bailey bridge. XXX Corps then continued its advance into the 82nd Airborne's area of operations where it was halted just shy of Arnhem due to German counterattacks along the length of the deep penetration.

The 101st Airborne continued to support XXX Corps advance during the remainder of Operation Market Garden with several running battles over the next several days. On 5 October after the operation had ended the 101st then came up to the Nijmegen salient and relieved the British 43rd Wessex Division to defend against the German counter offensive.

Battle of the Bulge

The 506th fought in the Battle of the Bulge from December 1944 to January 1945. In December, the unit, along with the rest of the 101st Airborne Division, was resting and refitting in France after Operation Market Garden. On 16 December, General Dwight D. Eisenhower, the Supreme Allied Commander on the Western Front, ordered them to move into the Belgian town of Bastogne by 18 December, so that the Germans would not gain access to its important crossroads. The short-notice move left the unit short of food, ammunition, arms, men, and winter clothing. The unit, along with the rest of the 101st Airborne, was encircled immediately. The 506th was sent to the eastern section of the siege. During the siege, there were reports of problems with tying in the gap in between the 501st PIR and the 506th. To stall the Germans so that the defense could be set up, the 1st Battalion of the 506th (along with Team Desobry from the 10th Armored Division) was sent out to fight the Germans in the towns of Noville and Foy. One-third (about 200 men) of the battalion were killed or wounded, but the unit took out 30 enemy tanks and inflicted 500 to 1,000 casualties. The battalion was put into reserve and the 2nd and 3rd Battalions were put on the lines. A supply drop on 22 December helped to some extent. After the U.S. Third Army, under General George Patton, broke the encirclement, the 506th stayed on the line and spearheaded the offensive by liberating Foy and Noville in January. They were then transferred to Haguenau and pulled off the line in late February 1945.

Rest of the war
The regiment was put back on the line on 2 April, and continued for the rest of the war, taking light casualties. It helped encircle the Ruhr Pocket and capture Berchtesgaden, then took up occupational duties in Zell am See, Austria. The 506th then began training to be redeployed to the Pacific theater but the war ended in August 1945.

Post World War II 
The 506th was deactivated in 1945, then was re-activated as the 506th Airborne Infantry Regiment in 1948–1949, again in 1950–1953 and finally, in 1954 to train recruits. Despite the designation "Airborne Infantry" and its continuing assignment in the 101st Airborne Division, none of these troops received airborne training, nor was the "Airborne" tab worn above the Divisional patch.

The colors of the 101st were reactivated as a combat division in 1956 under the Pentomic structure, which eliminated infantry regiments and battalions in favor of five battle groups per division. The colors of Company A, 504AIR were reactivated as HHC, 1st Airborne Battle Group, 506th Infantry, the only active element of the 506th. In february of 1962 The Battlegroup Reinforced deployed to the Philippines and pioneered the use of Hueys in Air Assault. It was the first US ground forces in the Philippines since WWII>  Just before the Cuban Missile Crisis, on 1 October 1962, C Company (the Division's alert-ready unit at the time) was deployed to Oxford, Mississippi to assist in restoring order after James Meredith arrived to integrate the University of Mississippi. The entire Battlegroup deployed to Oxford. The Battlegroup left Oxford and redeployed to Millington Naval Air Staition where they remained for sometime in the event of renewal of rioting.

Vietnam
The Pentomic structure was abandoned in 1964 in favor of brigades and battalions, and the 1st ABG, 506th Infantry was reorganized and redesignated as 1st Battalion (Airborne), 506th Infantry.  Additionally, the lineage of Co. B, 506AIR was reactivated as HHC, 2nd Battalion (Airborne), 506th Infantry.  Both battalions were part of the 3rd Brigade, 101st Airborne Division, which was deployed to Vietnam from late 1967 to 1971. 1-506th was recognized for its role during the Tet Offensive in early 1968 and the Battle of Hamburger Hill in May 1969 together with 2-506th, during the battle of FSB Ripcord.

On 1 April 1967 the colors of the former Company C, 506AIR were reactivated at Fort Campbell as HHC, 3rd Battalion, 506th Infantry. Assigned to the 1st Brigade, it served in Vietnam and was inactivated at Fort Campbell on 31 July 1972.

The division, including the 506th, was reorganized as Airmobile in 1968, later renamed Air Assault in 1974. During the Vietnam War, five soldiers from the 506th were awarded the Medal of Honor.

Post-Vietnam
When the 101st was reformed in 1973 at Fort Campbell (after its return from Vietnam), the 1st Battalion was the only active unit of the regiment, assigned to the division's 2nd Brigade. The battalion deployed to various training missions across the United States. In 1980, for example, deployments included Fort Drum, New York; Camp Grayling, Michigan; and Fort Polk, Louisiana. In addition, members of Charlie Company were present at President Ronald Reagan's inauguration, 20 January 1981. After redeployment from Fort Polk, "Hardcore Charlie" was detached to the 1st Battalion, 502nd Infantry, for operation Bright Star'81 in September, to "round out" that unit when it deployed to the Sinai for peacekeeping duties. This was the first U.S. military force to be deployed to the Middle East since the end of World War II. The battalion colors were inactivated on 5 June 1984 when all of the infantry battalions of the brigade were reflagged as elements of the 502nd Infantry.

South Korea

The battalion was reactivated on 16 March 1987 as part of the 2nd Brigade, 2nd Infantry Division in Korea, by reflagging the 1st Battalion, 9th Infantry Regiment, at Camp Greaves.  The 1st Battalion continued the mission to man Guard Posts Ouellette and Collier, conduct combat and recon patrols, man the southern entrance to the Korean Demilitarized Zone and maintain the bridge platoon that guarded Freedom Bridge. It was later reorganized as an air assault battalion, 1-506 Infantry (Air Assault) and eventually switched brigades in a 2nd Infantry Division reorganization in 1994. The majority of the battalion remained north of the Imjin River at Camp Greaves while its Alpha Company moved south of Freedom Bridge to Camp Giant in Munsan.

Iraq

In 2004, 1-506th was deployed from Korea to Habbaniyah, Iraq. Instead of returning to Korea, the battalion redeployed to Fort Carson, Colorado, on 30 September 2005 to be reflagged to 2-12th Infantry Regiment. On 30 September 2005 it was relieved (less personnel and equipment) from assignment to the 2d Infantry Division and assigned to the 4th Brigade Combat Team, 101st Airborne Division (Air Assault). Concurrently, a "new" 1-506th was created by reflagging an existing battalion within the 101st and assigning it to the division's 4th Brigade Combat Team. Additionally, the colors of 2-506th were reactivated within the 4th BCT, again by reflagging an existing battalion.

The 1st Battalion (1-506) deployed to Ramadi, Al-Anbar Province, Iraq, from November 2005 until November 2006. HHC (Hellraisers), Company A (AKA or Ass Kicking Alfa), Company B (Outlaws), Company C (Gunfighters), Company D (Death Dealers) and elements of Company E, 801st BSB (Wrench) occupied Camp Corregidor, the main FOB Camp Manhattan. Companies HHC, A, B, C and D were tasked with missions, mounted in M1114 HMMWV's and on foot in the "Mulaab" District of Ramadi. Company A occupied the combat outpost, which shared the facility with the HHC medical aid station (Voodoo), elements of Company E, 801st BSB (Wrench), and a platoon of sappers from Company C, 876th Engineer Battalion, part of the 2nd Brigade, 28th Division, Pennsylvania National Guard. Company A was tasked with operations ranging from the North of FOB Corregidor to the Euphrates River. Company B (Outlaw), was posted 7 kilometers to the east of the Corregidor FOB at OP Trotter, with a separate mission of protecting the most vulnerable part of the MSR (main supply route) leading into Ramadi, and the occupation of "OP Graveyard," an isolated and abandoned cemetery to the south of the MSR. Time magazine described Ramadi during this time as "The Most Dangerous Place." During this time, forward observers from Task Force 1-506 were the first to call in a GMLRS (Guided Multiple Launch Rocket System) strike in combat.

The 2d Battalion (2-506) deployed to Forward Operating Base Falcon in South Baghdad, cross-attached to the 4th Brigade, 4th Infantry Division from November 2005 until November 2006 under Lieutenant Colonel Gregory Butts.  During the Baghdad clearance operations that set the stage for the Iraq War troop surge of 2007 under General David Petraeus, the 2nd Battalion, 506th Infantry conducted the first deliberate clear-hold-build operation in the Doura Market as part of Operation Together Forward II under Multi-National Division – Baghdad (MND-B).  Careful examination of their TTPs (techniques, tactics, and procedures) for this combined, joint operation with the Iraqi National Police and Iraqi Police resulted in the emulation of their tactics for similar operations across Baghdad for the next six months, a temporary measure until surge forces could arrive and set up joint security stations (JSS).

Afghanistan

In early 2008 the 4th Brigade Combat Team (BCT), 101st Airborne Division (the 1-506th and 2-506th being part of that brigade), deployed in support of Operation Enduring Freedom in Afghanistan.  1st Battalion was deployed to the Ghazni, Wardak, and Western Paktika Provinces with the exception of Company A (Alfa), split in half (1st and 2nd platoons) along with a platoon from Company D (Delta) to assist a team from 10th Special Forces Group in the Northern province of Kapisa in the outpost Forward Operating Base (FOB) Kutchsbach for the first six months of the deployment. After completing their mission in establishing a safe area of operation in the Tagab valley and large compound to support a battalion of French forces, the units rejoined their companies that were scattered in the other provinces.  Much of the fighting was with insurgents that have attempted to interdict the main highway that runs from Kabul in the north to Kandahar in the south.  One three-man team, known as the Shamsheer team, part of the OCCP, was widely used in collecting intel, finding high-value targets and locating caches with the Afghan police.  Shamsheer was instrumental in the success for 1-506IN as they provided enemy TTP's and locations.  The 2nd Battalion was deployed primarily in the Khost regions, with elements serving in eastern Paktika and Kandahar provinces.  The 2nd Battalion's Company D (Delta) served in some of the most brutal firefights of the deployment, losing seven soldiers during rotation. The 506th returned to Fort Campbell in March 2009. In 2011 Charlie Company was deployed to FOB Khayr-Khot Castle where they assisted 5th & 20th Special Forces group.

In Spring 2013 the 4th Brigade Combat Team (BCT), 101st Airborne Division, deployed to Afghanistan in support of Operation Enduring Freedom.  With operations in southeastern Afghanistan, Task Force (TF) Currahee executed Security Force Assistance (SFA) operations to develop the capability of Afghan National Security Forces (ANSF), to include the Afghan National Army (ANA), Afghan Uniformed Police (AUP), the National Directorate of Security (NDS), and local, district, and provincial government officials. TF Currahee enabled the ANSF to assume security responsibility in the critical provinces of Khowst, Paktya, Paktika and South Ghazni and prepare for Afghanistan national elections in 2014.  Through a campaign that balanced both the requirement to develop ANSF tactical and operational capacity as well as the necessity to defeat a very active enemy force, TF Currahee attacked into enemy support zones alongside its partnered ANSF, despite operating at a reduced strength of 2,400 soldiers.  TF Currahee soldiers removed over 600 enemies of Afghanistan from the battlefield while simultaneously training, advising, and assisting their ANA partners of the 1st Brigade, 203rd ANA Corps.  This resulted in ANSF conducting operations in areas Coalition forces had not been since the beginning of OEF, as well as an ANSF unilateral combat operation in Paktya and Logar, the first since the arrival of Coalition forces since 2001.

1st Battalion, 506th Infantry Regiment, "Red Currahee," deployed to Paktya and Khowst Provinces at the end of April 2013.  TF Red Currahee assumed responsibility of over two thirds of the entire Brigade AOR on 22 May 13.  The initial battlespace encompassed an area approximately 2,809 square miles, to which the task force added responsibility for five additional districts, encompassing approximately 560 square miles, within Paktika Province in the final months of the deployment.  TF Red Currahee maintained responsibility for three assistance platforms (APs), with their ANSF counterparts.  The ANSF numbered approximately 8,500 strong, and consisted of the ANA, AUP, Provincial Response Company (PRC), Afghan Border Police (ABP), CRC, NDS, ALP, and an OCC-P HQ.  TF Red Currahee executed over 270 partnered patrols, 180 partnered named operations, and over 70 quick reaction force and time sensitive target missions.  Each company within the battalion immediately partnered with their ANSF partners to improve their capacity through advising and assisting them as the ANSF executed offensive combat operations.  TF Red Currahee targeted high-value individuals from each of these cells and killed approximately 150 enemies of Afghanistan and five high-value individuals.  Combined with ANSF and other task forces' operations, over 300 enemies were killed and nearly 250 detained.  TF Red Currahee fired over 2,291 rounds of artillery in support of ANSF and against enemy forces and executed 14 close-air support strikes and 11 ISR kinetic strikes.  In the time during which TF Red Currahee was responsible for the battlespace, kinetic activity increased at a rate of 144 percent compared to previous years, making it the most kinetic province in RC-East.  Without losing focus on lethal targeting, TF Red Currahee focused on the closure of its three APs.  AP Chamkani was the first AP in the AO to be transferred to the ANSF, followed by AP Zormat and AP Wilderness.  By TOA, Red Currahee retrograded over 106,458,842.44 million dollars worth of government property.

2nd Battalion, 506th Infantry Regiment, "White Currahee," in conjunction with three SFAAT teams, advised and assisted 2nd BN, 1st BDE, 203rd ANA Corps, 3rd BN, 1st BDE, 203rd ANA Corps, the Khowst OCC-P, the Afghan Border Police, and the Afghan Uniformed Police across the districts of Jaji Maidan, Bak, Sabari, Musa Khel, Qalandar, Terayzai, Gorbuz, Tani, and Matun. TF White Currahee built ANSF capabilities and confidence leading to long-term capacity by teaching, and mentoring ANSF to disrupt enemy networks in the crucial border province of Khowst.  TF White Currahee worked heavily with the ANSF to strengthen rule of law in the province through a warrant based targeting methodology that assisted the combined ANSF pillars to detain 53 enemy combatants.  The majority were convicted, and imprisoned and therefore weakened the enemy's ability to move materials and fighters into the interior of Afghanistan.

In honor of a fallen ANSF soldier, the "Hero of Khowst" competition was created by CSM Lamont Christian to mirror the U.S. Army's Sergeant Audie Murphy Club award.  Select NCOs from 3rd BN, 1st BDE, 203rd ANA Corps, were put through physical and mental tests and the top four competitors were recognized and awarded at FOB Salerno in the beginning of October.  The first ever NCO recipients of the award will carry on the event every year beyond U.S. presence.  TF White Currahee successfully transferred eastern Khowst province from ANSF security primacy to full ANSF control with the successful transfer of AFCOP Sabari, AFCOP Matun Hill, and FOB Salerno to the ANA. Following the transfers, the ANSF performed independent intelligence driven combined operations.  On the 10th anniversary day that the first U.S. task force sized unit arrived at FOB Salerno, TF White Currahee departed to conduct ANSF training across the remainder of Regional Command – East.

Current organization

As part of the Army-wide reduction of brigade combat teams, 4th Brigade Combat Team "Currahee", 101st Airborne Division was inactivated on 25 April 2014.

Presently, the 506th Infantry Regiment legacy continues through its infantry battalions which continue to serve within the 101st Airborne Division.

Current assignments of active units of the regiment:
1st Battalion, 506th Infantry [Regiment] "Red Currahee", 1st BCT "Bastogne", 101st Airborne Division
2nd Battalion, 506th Infantry [Regiment] "White Currahee", 3rd BCT "Rakkasan", 101st Airborne Division

Lineage, honors, and heraldry

Lineage
Constituted 1 July 1942 in the Army of the United States as the 506th Parachute Infantry

Activated 20 July 1942 at Camp Toccoa, Georgia

Assigned 10 June 1943 to the 101st Airborne Division

Inactivated 30 November 1945 in France

Redesignated 18 June 1948 as the 506th Airborne Infantry

Allotted 25 June 1948 to the Regular Army

Activated 6 July 1948 at Camp Breckinridge, Kentucky

Inactivated 1 April 1949 at Camp Breckinridge, Kentucky

Activated 25 August 1950 at Camp Breckinridge, Kentucky

Inactivated 1 December 1953 at Camp Breckinridge, Kentucky

Activated 15 May 1954 at Fort Jackson, South Carolina

Relieved 25 April 1957 from assignment to the 101st Airborne Division; concurrently reorganized and redesignated as the 506th Infantry, a parent regiment under the Combat Arms Regimental System

Withdrawn 16 March 1987 from the Combat Arms Regimental System and reorganized under the United States Army Regimental System

Constituted 16 September 2004 in the Regular Army as Headquarters, 4th Brigade Combat Team, 101st Airborne Division, and activated at Fort Campbell, Kentucky (The 4th BCT, 101st Abn Div was the next highest echelon above 1-506th and 2-506th and has a separate lineage from the 506th Infantry Regiment.)

Redesignated 1 October 2005 as the 506th Infantry Regiment

Re-aligned 16 April 2014 at Fort Campbell, Kentucky under 1st and 3d BCTs, 101st Abn Div.

Campaign participation credit

Decorations
Presidential Unit Citation (Army), Streamer embroidered NORMANDY

Presidential Unit Citation (Army), Streamer embroidered BASTOGNE

Presidential Unit Citation (Army), Streamer embroidered TRANG BANG

Presidential Unit Citation (Army), Streamer embroidered DONG AP BIA MOUNTAIN

Valorous Unit Award, Streamer embroidered PHAN THIET

Valorous Unit Award, Streamer embroidered DEFENSE OF SAIGON

Meritorious Unit Commendation (Army), Streamer embroidered VIETNAM 1968

Meritorious Unit Commendation (Army), Streamer embroidered IRAQ 2005-2006

French Croix de Guerre with Palm, World War II, Streamer embroidered NORMANDY

Netherlands Orange Lanyard

Belgian Croix de Guerre 1940 with Palm, Streamer embroidered BASTOGNE; cited in the order of the Day of the Belgian Army for action at Bastogne

Belgian Fourragere 1940: Cited in the Order of the Day of the Belgian Army for action in France and Belgium

Meritorious Unit Commendation (Army), Streamer embroidered AFGHANISTAN 2008-2009

Meritorious Unit Commendation (Army), Streamer embroidered AFGHANISTAN 2010-2011

Meritorious Unit Commendation (Army), Streamer embroidered AFGHANISTAN 2013

Heraldry

Coat of arms
Shield
The blue field is for the Infantry, the 506th's arm of the service. Thunderbolt indicates the regiment's particular threat and technique to attack: striking with speed, power, and surprise from the sky. Six parachutes represent the fact that the 506th was in the sixth parachute regiment activated in the U.S. Army, of which, the unit is proud. The green silhouette represents the Currahee Mountain -- the site of the regiment's activation (Toccoa, Ga.) -- and symbolizes the organization's strength, independence, and ability to stand alone for which paratroops are renowned.

Crest
The winged sword-breaker represents airborne troops. The conjoined caltraps stand for the enemy line of defense behind which paratroopers are dropped. They are two in number in reference to the unit's two air assault landings. The fleur-de-lis is for the Normandy invasion and the bugle horn, from the arms of Eindhoven, the Netherlands, refers to the organization's capture of that objective. The six large spikes of the caltraps stand for the unit's six decorations. The demi-roundel represents a section of the hub of a wheel. It stands for Bastogne, Belgium, strategic crossroads of highways and railways. The hub, surmounted by the winged sword-breaker, commemorates the organization's heroic defense of Bastogne in the Battle of the Bulge.
Motto
CURRAHEE. American Aboriginal, Cherokee Tongue meaning Stands Alone.

Background
The coat of arms was originally approved for the 506th Parachute Infantry Regiment on 20 Apr 1943. It was amended on 23 Aug 1943 to correct the blazon. The coat of arms was redesignated for the 506th Airborne Infantry Regiment on 18 Mar 1949. On 27 Feb 1958 it was redesignated for the 506th Infantry.

Notable members

Medal of Honor recipients
Of the twenty-two Medals of Honor awarded to soldiers of the 101st Airborne, seven were Currahees.
Clyde Lee Choate
Rank and organization: Staff Sergeant, U.S. Army, Company C, 601st Tank Destroyer Battalion
Place and date: Near Bruyeres, France, 25 October 1944
Leslie H. Sabo, Jr.
Rank and Organization: Specialist Four, U.S. Army, Company B, 3d Battalion, 506th Infantry, 101st Airborne Division
Place and Date: 10 May 1970, Se San, Cambodia
Frank A. Herda
Rank and Organization: Specialist Four, U.S. Army, Company A, 1st Battalion (Airborne), 506th Infantry, 101st Airborne Division (Airmobile)
Place and date: Near Dak To, Quang Trang Province, Republic of Vietnam, 29 June 1968
Gordon Ray Roberts
Rank and Organization: Sergeant (then Sp4.), U.S. Army, Company B, 1st Battalion, 506th Infantry, 101st Airborne Division
Place and Date: Thua Thien Province, Republic of Vietnam, 11 July 1969
Kenneth Michael Kays
Rank and Organization: Private First Class, U.S. Army, Headquarters and Headquarters Company, 1st Battalion, 506th Infantry, 101st Airborne Division
Place and Date: Thua Thien province, Republic of Vietnam, 7 May 1970
Andre Lucas
Rank and Organization: Lieutenant Colonel, U.S. Army, 2d Battalion, 506th Infantry, 101st Airborne Division
Place and Date: Fire Support Base Ripcord, Republic of Vietnam, 1 to 23 July 1970
Peter M. Guenette
Rank and Organization: Specialist Four, U.S. Army, Company D, 2d Battalion (Airborne), 506th Infantry, 101st Airborne Division (Airmobile)
Place and date: Quan Tan Uyen Province, Republic of Vietnam, 18 May 1968

World War II
 Donald Burgett, of Company A, fought from Normandy to the end of the war. He wrote four books on his time in the company.
 Sergeant Joseph Beyrle, of Company I, fought for US and Russian forces.
 Colonel (later Lieutenant General) Robert F. Sink, regimental commander for all of World War II.
 Lieutenant Colonel Robert Lee Wolverton, commanding officer of 3rd battalion.
 Easy Company, 2nd Battalion
 First Lieutenant Lynn "Buck" Compton, officer with Company E during World War II and chief prosecutor in the case of Sirhan Sirhan. He has published a book called "Call of Duty: My Life before, during and after the Band of Brothers".
 Staff Sergeant William "Wild Bill" Guarnere, a colorful noncom of Company E who maintained a website devoted to the history of the 506th until his death in 2014. The website continues to be maintained.
 First Lieutenant Carwood Lipton, company first sergeant, later promoted to 2nd Lieutenant via battlefield commission.
 Technical Sergeant Donald Malarkey, non-commissioned officer, served in Easy Company for the entire war. He has published a book called Easy Company Soldier.
 Captain Lewis Nixon, intelligence officer and close friend of Major Richard Winters.
 Lieutenant Colonel Herbert Sobel, initial commanding officer.
 Lieutenant Colonel Ronald Speirs, took command of Company E during their assault on Foy, Belgium in January 1945. Final commanding officer. Went on to become commandant of Spandau Prison.
 Private First Class David Webster, a rifleman and diarist of Company E whose book Parachute Infantry deals in detail with the 506th.
 Major Richard Winters started out as a platoon leader in Company E. Was made company commander when the commander's (Lieutenant Meehan) plane was shot down on D-Day. He was made 2nd Battalion Executive Officer during Operation Market Garden in October 1944. Took over as acting battalion commander during the siege of Bastogne. Became permanent 2nd battalion commander in March 1945, and stayed in that position until the end of the war. He published a memoir of his war service (Beyond Band of Brothers) and has also been the subject of a biography (Biggest Brother).
 Filthy Thirteen

Vietnam
 Lieutenant Colonel Andre Lucas, commanded the 2nd Battalion in Vietnam during the battle of FSB Ripcord, killed in action, posthumously awarded the Medal of Honor.
 Specialist 4 Gordon Roberts awarded the Medal of Honor.
 Sgt. Leslie Halasz Sabo, killed during Operation Binh Tay I, posthumously awarded the Medal of Honor on 16 May 2012.

In popular culture

The book Band of Brothers tells the story of Easy Company, and was the basis of a successful TV miniseries, aired on HBO.
In the film Saving Private Ryan, the titular Pvt. James Francis Ryan of Iowa states he was assigned to Baker Company (B Co.) 1-506th. Captain Miller also encountered 506th Pathfinders early on in the movie during the search for Pvt. Ryan.
In the video game Call of Duty, the player character in the American campaign is depicted as a soldier from the 506th as denoted by the Poker Spade insignia on his M1 helmet. Call of Duty: WWII celebrated the Veterans Day, where there are three different videos, one of them of Paul Martinez from the 506th Parachute Infantry Regiment.
in the film Saints and Soldiers the characters are from the 506th Infantry Regiment, as depicted by the black Spade on their helmets.
In the Tom Clancy novel Without Remorse, Emmet Ryan, father of Jack Ryan, claimed to have jumped on D-Day with "E 2-506th".
In the Company of Heroes computer game, the player controls paratroopers from 506th's Fox Company in some of the main campaign missions.

References

Further reading
 
 
 
 
 
 
  (available from FSB Ripcord Association)

External links

506th Airborne Infantry Regiment Association, a charitable veterans organization supporting both veteran and active duty Currahees
The New Band of Brothers

 Regimental and battalion lineages on the U.S. Army Center of Military History website:
 1st Battalion, 506th Infantry Regiment
 2d Battalion, 506th Infantry Regiment

506
Military units and formations established in 1942
101st Airborne Division
506
506